Ischnoglossa is a genus of beetles belonging to the family Staphylinidae.

The species of this genus are found in Europe.

Species:
 Ischnoglossa angustiventris Casey 
 Ischnoglossa asperata Casey

References

Staphylinidae
Staphylinidae genera